Milisav Koljenšić (Serbian Cyrillic: Милисав Кољеншић; 31 December 1912 – 1963) was a Montenegrin Major General with the Yugoslav People's Army (JNA). He is notable for being the maternal uncle of Slobodan Milošević.

Career
Prior to the Second World War, he practiced law. In 1941, he joined the Yugoslav Partisans and the Communist Party of Yugoslavia. During the war, he was the political commissar of several units. He later graduated from the Yugoslav People's Army Higher Military Academy. After the war he was head of the KOS department and head of the School Security Center.

Death and legacy
He died from suicide in 1963. He is interred in the Alley of People's Heroes in the Belgrade New Cemetery. His wife Hristina "Kitka" Koljenšić (1922–2017) was interred next to him upon her death.

An elementary school in Danilovgrad is named after him.

References

1912 births
1963 deaths
People from Danilovgrad
Yugoslav Partisans members
Yugoslav communists
Generals of the Yugoslav People's Army
Montenegrin generals
Montenegrin communists
Slobodan Milošević
Suicides by firearm in Serbia
Burials at Belgrade New Cemetery